Barry Railway Class J were  steam locomotives of the Barry Railway in South Wales.  They were designed by J. F. Hosgood, built by both Hudswell Clarke and Sharp, Stewart and Company and were introduced in 1897. Their main use was on the Barry to Cardiff suburban service and had a reputation for always being smartly turned out.  They were all shedded at Barry. The locomotives passed to the Great Western Railway in 1922.  None survived into British Railways ownership and none have been preserved.

Numbering

References

 (reprint with addenda and amendments)

J
2-4-2T locomotives
Hudswell Clarke locomotives
Sharp Stewart locomotives
Railway locomotives introduced in 1897
Standard gauge steam locomotives of Great Britain
Scrapped locomotives
Passenger locomotives